Anarak (also Romanized as Anārak) is a city and capital of Anarak District, in Nain County, Isfahan Province, Iran. At the 2006 census, its population was 1,285, in 462 families.

The city is surrounded by ruins of an old wall and three watchtowers, which were built about 100 years ago to keep Hossein Kashi and his bandit gang out. There is little agriculture in this region, but there are many mines located near Anarak. Nakhlalk, a lead mine, is the largest active mine near Anarak.

The people in Anarak speak a dialect called Anaraki. This language is spoken in Anarak and cities within  of it, such as Chopanan. There is also a museum in Anarak about its history; you may also purchase books with the family tree of families from Anarak.

Anarak's climate is a typical desert climate, little rainfall, hot dry summer days and cool nights. Most of the old homes are adobe and have a courtyard; people move from south to north of the courtyard from winter to summer.

References

Populated places in Nain County
Cities in Isfahan Province